Lutsk Gymnasium #  21 after Mikhail Kravchuk  (urkr. Луцька гімназія №21 імені Михайла Кравчука) is an elementary (grades 1-4), middle (grades 5-9) and high (grades 10-11) school with the specialization in some subjects, determined yearly according to the students' and parents' wishes, recommendations of senior teachers and a staff psychologist.

Teaching Stuff 

Teaching stuff includes 110 teachers, working in 8 subject streams

Events 
 1996 — school visited by Chairman of the Verkhovna Rada
 1998 — school visited by President of Ukraine
 2010 — President of Ukraine signed an order of commemorating a student of grade 11, Borodkina Natalia with a Taras Shevchenko stipend.
 2014 — Gymnasium # 21 is the only school in the city of Lutsk to make in to the list of top 50 Ukrainian schools.

References 

 http://www.volynnews.com/news/society/ianukovych__nahorodyv_luchanku-shkolyarku_stypendiyeyu/

Education in Lutsk
Schools in Ukraine